Johnny Boy were an indie pop band from Liverpool, England which consisted of two members; the London born Lolly Hayes (Lorraine Hayward) and the Liverpool resident Davo (Andrew Davitt, a keyboard tech for the Manic Street Preachers). Both of them, when asked about their roles in the duo, commonly specified them by giving the generic answer of "Vocals, loops and guitars".

Biography
Formed in 2002, Johnny Boy took their name from Robert De Niro’s character in Martin Scorsese's film, Mean Streets. Their debut single, "Johnny Boy Theme" featured Scorsese's opening voice-over from the film.
 
Their single "You Are The Generation That Bought More Shoes And You Get What You Deserve" was produced by James Dean Bradfield (of Manic Street Preachers) and achieved critical acclaim. The single reached #50 in the UK Singles Chart in August 2004. Bradfield also co-produced their debut album, Johnny Boy, which received mixed reviews.

Johnny Boy described their sound as "Church bells, boy-girl vocals, loops, twists, warps, walls of sound and edgy guitars combined to rekindle the idea of Sandinista!-era Clash having an, erm, shootout with Phil Spector".

Discography

Singles 
 "Johnny Boy Theme" (2003)
 "You Are the Generation that Bought More Shoes and You Get What You Deserve" (2004)

Albums 
 Johnny Boy (2006)

References

See also
Johnny Boy Soprano

Musical groups from Liverpool
British indie pop groups